Rim El Benna (born May 30, 1981 in Nabeul), is a Tunisian actress.

She was on the cover of Tunivisions in June 2012.

Filmography

Feature film 
 2009 : Les Secrets by Raja Amari : as Selma
 2013 : Jeudi après-midi by Mohamed Damak
 2014 : Printemps tunisien by Raja Amari

Short film 
 2010 : Adeem by Adel Serhan
 2011 : D'Amour et d'eau fraîche by Ines Ben Othman

Television series
 2009 : Aqfas Bila Touyour by Ezzeddine Harbaoui
 2010 : Min Ayam Mliha by Abdelkader Jerbi 
 2017 : La Coiffeuse by Zied Litayem

Television film 
 2005 : Imperium: Saint Peter by Giulio Base, and Omar Sharif
 2010 : Who Framed Jesus by Marc Lewis

References

External links
 
 
 

1981 births
Living people
Tunisian film actresses
People from Nabeul